Solginsky is a rural locality (a settlement) in Velsky District, Arkhangelsk Oblast, Russia. The population was 1,526 as of 2010. There are 28 streets.

Geography 
Solginsky is located 53 km west from Velsk (the district's administrative centre) by road, on the Vel River. Yakushevskaya is the nearest rural locality.

References 

Rural localities in Velsky District